Blood Tsunami is a Norwegian thrash metal band from Oslo, formed by Peter Michael Kolstad Vegem in 2004 and currently signed to Indie Recordings.

Biography

2003–2004
Lead vocalist and lead guitarist Peter Michael Kolstad Vegem (a.k.a. Pete Evil) had been fronting his punk/rock' roll band, Hellride, for several years, but when this band broke up late in 2003, he decided form a heavy metal band, and began to write material for his yet unnamed new band. In early January 2004 he formed Blood Tsunami.

Jørgen Nordli (a.k.a. Jay) joined on drums and the two immediately started rehearsing on Pete's material. The first Blood Tsunami song was "Killing Spree". Shortly after Pete found a bass player in Frode Sørskaar (a.k.a. Riff Randall) and Kristoffer Sørensen (a.k.a. Dor Amazon) joined on lead guitar.

During the spring of 2004 this line up recorded a 4-song demo. Blood Tsunami's debut live performance took place on 24 August 2004, at a small club in Oslo called Last Train, supporting for Swedish death metal band Entombed.

2005–2007 
Frode Sørskaar didn't feel comfortable with playing metal, so Pete contacted his former bandmate from Hellride, Peter Boström (a.k.a. Bosse). Bosse was into metal and the two had shared many drunken nights listening to Slayer and Judas Priest in the back of the Hellride van.

With Bosse on bass, Blood Tsunami decided to record another demo. During January 2005 they went to Sverre Dæhli (Audiopain) who runs his own little studio called Fias Co Prod Studios. There they attempted to record a new song called "Evil Unleashed", but it soon became evident that Jay had problems behind the drumkit. Songs like "Evil Unleashed" and "Stabbed To Death" did not maintain the right speed and intensity that Pete wanted. Recording was stopped and, disappointed, the band returned to the rehearsal space. It was a tough decision as Jay had become a very good friend and was a devoted member of the band, but he had to go.

At this time, Pete had recently joined as the bass player of a punk band called Bomberos. Bomberos consisted of Bjørn Hinkel, Sven Erik Kristiansen (a.k.a. Maniac, ex Mayhem, Skitliv) and Einar Sursjø (a.k.a. Necrodevil of Infernö, Virus, Beyond Dawn etc. ). Pete only played one concert with this band, but as Necrodevil decided to quit the Bomberos, little Bjørn Hinkel soon hired a new drummer. During a few rehearsals with the new Bomberos drummer it was obvious to Pete that he needed this guy in Blood Tsunami.

Pete gave Bård Eithun (a.k.a. Faust, ex- Emperor, Aborym, Scum) the Blood Tsunami demo from 2004 and asked if he would give it a try. Faust agreed and shortly after he became a permanent member of Blood Tsunami. Both Pete and Faust left Bomberos the very next day.

The new Blood Tsunami line up recorded a five-song demo at Lion Heart Studios in Oslo with engineer Øyvind Voldmo Larsen. Now, with Faust on drums, the band was suddenly a well oiled machine and an old song like "Killing Spree" sounded quite different and very improved compared to the 2004 version. New songs on this demo included "Evil Unleashed", "Infernal Final Carnage", "Suicide Anthem", "Stabbed To Death" and a new version of "Let Blood Rain". Faust had the technical skills and the speed the band had been missing. Bosse also gave the band a new sound with his dark growling backing vocals. Another surprise on this demo was the track "Suicide Anthem" where Bosse provided clean vocals in the chorus. This was something Pete and Faust was very skeptical towards as they both despised bands who mixed aggressive vocals with clean vocals, but still it passed. Simply because Bosse's clean vocals lift the song to an unknown level.

"Suicide Anthem" would not get an official release before it was included on the "Castle of Skulls" EP in 2009.

During 2006, without much explanation, Bosse suddenly decided to leave the band. He was quickly replaced by Stig Atle Amundsen (a.k.a. Stu Manx, ex-Gluecifer, ex-The Yum Yums). With a new bass player the band started the long process of rehearsing old material instead of writing new songs. Just like Riff Randall, Stu Manx was also more into rock 'n roll and he soon lost interest. He started skipping rehearsals and rather quickly it became obvious that the guy wasn't too keen on
playing with Blood Tsunami. Pete, Dor and Faust continued as a trio.

The good news in the middle of the bass player-mess was that the 2005 demo secured Blood Tsunami a deal with Nocturnal Art Productions and Candlelight Recordings. The boss of Nocturnal Art Productions, Tomas Haugen (a.k.a. Samoth) is a good friend of Faust and they are both former members of legendary Norwegian Black Metal Band Emperor. Tomas gave Blood Tsunami a chance, but as he stated several times. "This is not a favor for a friend. The music speaks for itself. If I didn't like the band I would have never signed them".

In 2006, when it was time to sign contracts, Pete made a quick phone call to Bosse. The idea of recording an album was appealing and Bosse agreed to join Blood Tsunami again. Once again the band entered Lion Heart studios with Øyvind Voldmo Larsen and embarked on the recording sessions with high spirits. "Killing Spree" was recorded for the third time in two years and other demo songs like "Evil Unleashed", "Infernal Final Carnage" and "Stabbed To Death" also made it onto the album. The latter was given a new title and became known as "Torn Apart". Unfortunately, but because of various reasons the album ended up with a production that became way too polished for the band's taste. In retrospect the band regret this and wished they had paid more attention to the actual producing process while recording the album.

One track on the album stood out and became a milestone in the band's career. The track was the instrumental called "Godbeater"; a ten-minute instrumental that bears resemblance to how Metallica sounded in the mid-1980s. The track was born when Pete compiled a bunch of old riffs he had never used and soon it grew into this long grandiose instrumental.

Pete and Faust had already decided that they wanted Blood Tsunami to have a strong visual 1980s feeling. Pete wanted something in the vein of Lawere's artwork for Kreator's "Pleasure To Kill" and started looking for artists. At this time Lawere could not be found. Ken Kelly, another favorite of Pete's, never replied to the mails and Derek Riggs turned out to be too expensive. Then Pete started looking through some Marvel comics and found the name of Alexander Orlandelli Horley. Horley's drawing was exactly what Pete was looking for and he soon got in touch with the Italian born, US based, artist. Pete explained what kind of cover he wanted. -"An evil warrior with a big scythe standing triumphant on top of a pile of mutilated corpses". Alex Horley quickly delivered the goods and created one striking album cover. Pete also designed a new logo for the band.

At some point an idea for an album title came up. Pete suggested it would be funny to simply call the album Thrash Metal. This turned out to be a bad idea as the music itself wasn't strictly "thrash" but also contained Death Metal and rock 'n roll influences. Pete's vocals was also a subject for debate as many listeners meant it was too Black Metal for Thrash Metal. Anyway, the band didn't think much about this until they started reading reviews where the album title was constantly being criticized. They soon understood that it had been a big mistake to give the album such a genre-binding title and as Pete later stated: -"We kinda "shot ourselves in the foot" with that title as we gave everyone a golden opportunity to criticize us for not being enough thrash metal. Instead of listening to a good metal album they only heard what was wrong with it... Too bad. I deeply regret not calling the album "Godbeater". That would have been a much better title and it would've given the album its own identity and saved us from all the slagging and nagging by reporters and metalheads who thought we were pissing all over the heritage of thrash metal."

Blood Tsunami's debut album "Thrash Metal" was released by Nocturnal Art Productions and Candlelight Records on 19 March 2007. The album received very good reviews in the worldwide metal press and sold quite well. Blood Tsunami soon went on a UK tour with their friends in Zyklon and the British Death Metal band Dead Beyond Buried.

2008–2009 
The band continued to play shows, mostly in Norway but also a few abroad and they made quick "one off's" in Italy and Denmark. The band had problems with going on longer tours as both Pete and Faust had family commitments. They spent much time rehearsing and Pete had soon composed enough material for a second album. During the fall of 2008 Blood Tsunami entered Lion Heart Studios with Øyvind Voldmo Larsen for the third time inthree years and began working on the album that later would be known as "Grand Feast For Vultures", which was released by Nocturnal Art Productions and Candlelight Records on 27 April 2009. The album was praised by the metal communities of the world and received critical acclaim. Once again Alex Horley made the artwork and by suggestions from Pete he came up with a grotesque painting of a rotten corpse hanging in the middle of a battlefield. A big vulture is picking out his eye. The triumphant warrior from the debut was now replaced with by rotting corpse, but still the album displayed a much more confident band compared to the debut album. This time Blood Tsunami had focused on the whole production and came up with a sound that did the material justice.

As the lyrical content of "Thrash Metal" was all fictional stuff evolving around war, death and hell, "Grand Feast For Vultures" contained more personal lyrics. Pete had penned down his problems with alcohol and depression and all this was being screamed out in songs like "Personal Exorcism", "Laid To Waste" and "One Step Closer To The Grave". Lyrically, the opening track "Castle of Skulls" was more in the vein of the older material, but still if you read the lyrics they are written with a "us against them" theme and Pete later explained that the song was intended to be a battle cry for "Metalheads against Posers".

"Grand Feast for Vultures" also contained an instrumental. This instrumental was composed by Pete during 2008 and contained an impressive amount of riffs, harmonies and time signatures. The big difference compared to the previous instrumental "Godbeater" was the introduction of NWOBHM influences and the Iron Maiden-esque main themes. The new instrumental was first entitled "Enceladus Rising" and this title even made it on the first promotional copies that was shipped off to the US press and radio stations. This error explains why many Americans still calls this track for "Enceladus Rising". Before the actual booklet was being pressed Pete changed his mind and wanted the track to be called "Horsehead Nebula". Pete explained: "I wanted a title that both included something tremendously big and at the same time something very beautiful. Enceladus was one of the giants in Greek Mythology, but I reckon that he wasn't particularly beautiful. Enceladus is also the name given to one of the moons that goes in orbit around Saturn. That was more interesting and I started thinking about space... I digged up photos of various nebulas and in the back of my head I remembered a photos I had seen of this gigantic nebula with the shape of a horse head. I looked it up and the second I saw the photo I immediately knew I had the right title for the instrumental. The Horsehead Nebula is a dark nebula in the constellation Orion. It is located just to the south of the star Alnitak, which is farthest east on Orion's Belt, and is part of the much larger 'Orion molecular cloud complex'. The latter is of course bigger, but to use that as a title would have linked our instrumental up to Metallica's 'Orion' and it also sounds like something an industrial band would have called their album, so that option was quickly ditched."

Horsehead Nebula is the most challenging piece of music ever composed by Pete and it is being hailed as the masterpiece in the Blood Tsunami catalogue by both fans and press.

Unfortunately, but for some unknown reason, Candlelight turned down Blood Tsunami's request for an economical advance so they could embark on an extensive European tour together with two American bands. Namely Absu and Nachtmystium. This set back compared with other booking problems made the band disgruntled and disappointed. The members and especially the driving force of Pete and Faust felt that they were working hard for little, or close to no reward. The once high spirits
fell to an all-time low. Blood Tsunami played one show after the release of "Grand Feast For Vultures" and that show took place at Elm Street in Oslo in August 2009. Then Blood Tsunami disappeared.

2009–2013 
During the summer of 2009, Pete had hooked up with his old friend Kristopher Schau (a.k.a. Max Cargo, ex- The Cumshots, Datsun, The Dogs, The Terrifieds). The two buddies used to play together in a punk band called Datsun in the late 1990s and Pete suggested: -"Hey, let's start up a band that doesn't care about genres. Let's do something like Zeke and The Dwarves and just play our balls off, get drunk and raise hell". Kristopher responded with a short "Yes" and they soon began to rehearse with Pete on guitar and Kristopher on vocals. The band was, for some stupid reason, called Mongo Ninja and both Faust and Dor became members of this band. The fifth member and bass player was Mads Martinsen. He works for an Oslo-based Booking Agency called Amber Booking. This connection resulted in a very busy touring schedule for the three Blood Tsunami guys. Once again Pete's creativity blossomed and within twelve months Mongo Ninja recorded and released three albums through the Oslo-based label, Indie Recordings. During this period Candlelight dropped Blood Tsunami and once again Bosse left the band. No one of the remaining Blood Tsunami members cared much about this as they were having a good time with Mongo Ninja.

After three years of touring and partying Pete began to miss Blood Tsunami. He felt that Mongo Ninja had accomplished what they set out to do and that the fun-part had slowly been replaced with duties and responsibilities. Faust, Dor and Pete began rehearsing some new material Pete had written and soon a few new Blood Tsunami songs emerged. The first songs to be ready was called "Metal Fang", "The Rape of Nanking" and "The Cruel Leading The Fool". The lyrical content had changes during the Mongo Ninja years as Pete incorporated his Mongo Ninja trademark of writing lyrics about real persons and true crimes. Now they had to find a new bass player.

Priscila Morales, (a.k.a. Proxy) a well known manager and booking agent in the Norwegian Metal scene, had gotten herself a new boyfriend. The chosen one was a Swedish longhaired punk rocker who played guitar in a punk band called Speedergarben. Pete asked Proxy if her new flame played bass and she quickly replied... "He can play bass".

Carl Janfalk (a.k.a. Calle) showed up and during the very first rehearsal it was obvious that he was the right guy. No bullshit, no stress, no worries! Carl was in. Blood Tsunami entered Midrange Studios in January 2012 and together with engineer Anders Henningsen they recorded a new 6 track demo. The new demo displayed a band that had gotten harder, dirtier and meaner during their hiatus. The songs was shorter, more in your face and stripped to the bone. Long gone was the NWOBHM influences, long gone was the Swedish sounding riffs, long gone was the screaming vocals and the growling backing vocals. Long gone was the ten billion kick drums and long song structures. Blood Tsunami was reborn and appeared to be more pissed off, ferocious and vicious that ever before.

The quartet started playing live again and the first show for the new line up took place at Revolver in Oslo on 25 February 2012, as support for the British thrash band Virus. One month later Blood Tsunami entered Unholy Pub in Oslo and supported Grave Desecrator from Brazil.

Blood Tsunami was looking for a new label and the demo was shipped off to a few candidates. They got plenty of positive feedback and received some good offers, but this time they didn't want to rush things. Patiently they waited and finally Norway's own Indie Recordings had listened to the demo. A deal was signed and once again Blood Tsunami could enter the studio. In June 2012 they started the recording sessions at Sverre Dæhli's Fias Co Prod Studios where Faust nailed the drums within a few hours. Then they continued in Midrange Studios with Anders Henningsen and things was looking good.

Problems occurred when it was time to lay down the vocals. It turned out that Pete had seriously damaged his vocal chords and to get well he would need surgery. This set back forced them to postpone the recording session with almost two months. This break was spent to create the artwork and booklet. The whole graphic design was tailor-made to suit the new musical content of Blood Tsunami. Dark, filthyand all in black and white. American artist Christian Sloan Hall designed the artwork, Norwegian photographer Kjell Ivar Lund took the band photos and Pete once again designed a new band logo. The outcome is hard, mean and "in your face". Just like the music!

The new album has a Norwegian title. It is called "For Faen!" and according to the press release this is one of the most common words in the Norwegian language. "For Faen" can be translated into two things. Directly translated it means "For The Devil", but it can also mean something like "For Fuck's Sake".

For Faen! was released by Indie Recordings on 8 March 2013.

2013–2018 
On 27 April 2018, they released Grave Condition, their first album in five years.

Discography

Studio albums

Demos

EPs

Band members
 Pete Evil (Peter Michael Kolstad Vegem) – vocals, rhythm guitar (2004–present)
 Dor Amazon (Kristoffer Sørensen) – lead guitars, backing vocals (2004–present)
 Faust (Bård G. Eithun) – drums (2005–present)
 Calle (Carl Janfalk) – bass, backing vocals (2011–present)

Former members 
 Peter "Bosse" Boström – bass and backing vocals (2005–2009)
 Riff Randall (Frode Sørskaar) – bass (2004–2005)
 Stu Manx (Stig Amundsen) – bass (2005)
 Jørgen "Jay" Nordlie – drums (2004–2005)

Timeline

References

External links
Official website
 Official MySpace profile

Musical groups established in 2004
2004 establishments in Norway
Norwegian thrash metal musical groups
Musical quartets
Musical groups from Oslo